The New England Nor'easters football team represents University of New England in college football at the NCAA Division III level. The Nor'easters are members of the Commonwealth Coast Conference (CCC), fielding its team in the CCC since 2018. The Nor'easters play their home games at Blue Storm Stadium in Biddeford, Maine. 

Their head coach is Mike Lichten, who took over the position for the 2017 season.

History 
In December 2014, school president Danielle Ripich announced that football would be added as a varsity sport for the university for the 2016 or 2017 season. The team would play on the blue-turfed field of Blue Storm Stadium.

On February 4, 2016, New England hired Mike Lichten from Becker.

Conference affiliations
 Club team (2017)
 Commonwealth Coast Conference (2018–present)

List of head coaches

Key

Coaches

Year-by-year results

Notes

References

External links
 

 
American football teams established in 2017
2017 establishments in Maine